Ahmad Hardi (1922 – 29 October 2006) was a prominent Kurdish poet.

He was born into an intellectual family in Sulaimaniya in Iraqi Kurdistan. He possessed a deep knowledge of classical Kurdish, Arabic and Persian poetry and has had an enduring influence on the modern Kurdish poetry. He was a leading figure in the Kurdish liberation movement. After the Algiers Accord, he moved to Iran in 1975 and later to U.K. in 1993. His daughter Choman Hardi is a well known Kurdish poet, and his son Asos Hardi is a prominent journalist in Iraqi Kurdistan and founder of Hawlati and Awena independent newspapers. His first collection of poems was first published in 1957 and has been re-published several times since then.

Books
 The Secret of Solitude, 1957

See also
 Nalî 
 Mahwi 
 Piramerd 
 Abdulla Goran  
 Sherko Bekas

References

External links
 The Passing of a Kurdish Icon – Ahmad Hardi, Oct.29, 2006.
 Ahmad Hardi, International Journal of Kurdish Studies, January 2005.
 About Choman Hardi, Kathleen McDermot.
 When the secret of lips and the secret of eyes unite, A poem by Ahmad Hardi, translated by Dr. Kamal Mirawdeli.
 Ahmed Hardi

1922 births
2006 deaths
Kurdish poets
20th-century Iraqi poets
People from Sulaymaniyah
Iraqi Kurdish people
Kurdish journalists
Kurdish nationalists
Iraqi politicians
Iraqi expatriates in Iran
Iraqi journalists
21st-century Iraqi poets
Iraqi expatriates in the United Kingdom